The Tour de Martinique is a multi-day road cycling race held annually in Martinique. First held in 1965, it was part of the UCI America Tour in 2005 and then from 2008 to 2011 as a 2.2 event.

Winners

Notes

References 

Cycle racing in Martinique
UCI America Tour races
Cycle races in France
Recurring sporting events established in 1956
1965 establishments in France